This article is a list of notable Asian Americans.

Academia
Manjul Bhargava, mathematician
Raj Chetty, professor of economics
Leon O. Chua, computer scientist
S. I. Hayakawa, professor of English, president of San Francisco State University, and U.S. Senator 
Sumiko Hennessy, professor of social work
Hao Huang, Frankel Chair of Music, ethnomusicologist, Scripps College
Jaegwon Kim, professor of philosophy
Jagdish Natwarlal Bhagwati, professor of economics
Eswar Prasad, economist
Raghuram Rajan, economist and an international academician
Amartya Sen, economist and philosopher 
Jim Toy, gay activist & educator
S. R. Srinivasa Varadhan, NYU mathematician
Ocean Vuong, writer, poet, professor
Thomas Zacharia, computational material sciences
Astrid S. Tuminez, Utah Valley University, President
Conrado Gempesaw, Former President, St. John's University

Science

Subrahmanyan Chandrasekhar, 1983 Nobel laureate in Physics.
Min Chueh Chang, co-inventor of the combined oral contraceptive pill.
Shiing-Shen Chern, mathematician and winner of the 1983 Wolf Prize for his work in differential geometry.
Steven Chu, Nobel laureate in Physics in 1997 for research on cooling and trapping atoms using laser light and former United States Secretary of Energy.
David D. Ho, HIV/AIDS researcher
June Huh, mathematician, 2022 Fields Medal winner. 
Michio Kaku, theoretical physicist
Har Gobind Khorana, shared the Nobel laureate in "Physiology or Medicine" in 1968 for work in genetics and protein synthesis.
Tsung-Dao Lee, received the 1957 Nobel Laureate in Physics for work in particle physics along with Chen Ning Yang.
Yuan T. Lee, 1986 Nobel Prize winner in Chemistry
Syukuro Manabe, 2021 Nobel Laureate in Physics
Shuji Nakamura, 2014 Nobel Laureate in Physics
Yoichiro Nambu, 2008 Nobel laureate in Physics
Santa J. Ono, former President University of Cincinnati, immunologist and vision scientist, current President University of Michigan
Charles J. Pedersen, 1987 Nobel laureate in Chemistry.
Ching W. Tang, inventor of the organic light-emitting diode and the hetero-junction organic photovoltaic cell. Winner of the 2011 Wolf Prize in Chemistry.
Terence Tao, mathematician, 2006 Fields Medal winner.
Samuel C.C. Ting, 1976 Nobel laureate in physics for discovering the existence of a new particle called j/psi.
Roger Y. Tsien, 2008 Nobel Prize winner in chemistry, for the discovery of the green fluorescent protein.
Daniel Tsui, 1998 Nobel laureate in Physics for contributions to the discovery of the fractional Quantum Hall effect.
Chien-Shiung Wu, winner of the 1978 Wolf Prize in Physics. First woman to be elected president of American Physical Society.
Chen Ning Yang, received the 1957 Nobel Laureate in Physics for work in particle physics along with Tsung-Dao Lee.
Shing-Tung Yau, mathematician, 1982 Fields Medal winner.

Arts/architecture/design
Fazlur Rahman Khan, a Bangladeshi-American structural engineer and architect, who was considered the "Einstein of structural engeering", he was the designer of the Willis Tower and John Hancock Center
Salma Arastu, artist
Rina Banerjee, artist
David Choe, artist
Dhairya Dand, inventor and artist
George Fan, video game designer, Plants vs. Zombies
Maya Lin, architect, designed the Vietnam Veterans Memorial
Seong Moy, artist and printmaker
Jane Ng, 3D environmental artist
Yatin Patel, photographer and artist
Gyo Obata, architect, designed the National Air and Space Museum
IM Pei, renowned architect, designed the Rock and Roll Hall of Fame and the Louvre Pyramid
Mimi So, jewelry designer
Manick Sorcar, animator, artist
Minoru Yamasaki, architect, designed the World Trade Center
Vern Yip, interior designer, appeared on TLC's Trading Spaces and HGTV's Deserving Design and Design Star
Chanel Miller, artist
Yu-kai Chou, gamification designer and pioneer

Business and industry

Revathi Advaithi, CEO of Flex (company)
Parag Agrawal, CEO of Twitter
Hiroaki Aoki, founder of Benihana
Nikesh Arora, CEO of Palo Alto Networks
Ramani Ayer, chairman and CEO of The Hartford Financial Services Group
Nandita Bakhshi, CEO of Bank of the West
Somen Banerjee, founder of Chippendales
Ajay Banga, president and CEO of MasterCard
Manoj Bhargava, billionaire founder and CEO of 5-hour Energy
Sabeer Bhatia, co-founder of Hotmail
Baiju Bhatt, co-founder of Robinhood
Aneel Bhusri, CEO of Workday
Aman Bhutani, CEO of GoDaddy
Sanjit Biswas, co-founder of Cisco Meraki
Amar Bose, billionaire chairman and founder of Bose Corporation
Do Won Chang, billionaire co-founder of Forever 21
Fred Chang, Taiwanese American billionaire founder and CEO of Newegg
Roger H. Chen, founder of 99 Ranch Market
Sam Chang, founder and CEO of McSam Hotel Group, one of largest hotel developers in New York City
Albert Chao, billionaire co-founder and CEO of Westlake Chemical, largest producer LDPE plastic in the US 
Allen Chao, founder of Watson Pharmaceuticals
Jay Chaudhry, CEO and founder of Zscaler
Christine Chen, founder and CEO of Chen Communications
John S. Chen, executive chairman and CEO of BlackBerry Limited, former CEO of Sybase 
Eva Chen, co-founder and CEO of Trend Micro
Perry Chen, founder and CEO of Kickstarter
Steve Chen, co-founder of YouTube
Tim Chen, co-founder and CEO of NerdWallet
Chen Wen-ch'i, billionaire president and CEO of VIA Technologies, husband of Cher Wang, co-founder of HTC 
Andrew Cherng, billionaire co-founder of Panda Express
Peggy Cherng, billionaire co-founder of Panda Express
David Chu, co-founder of Nautica
James Chu, founder of ViewSonic
Alfred Chuang, founder and CEO of BEA Systems
Francisco D'Souza, former CEO of Cognizant
Weili Dai, billionaire and co-founder
Bharat Desai, billionaire co-founder of Syntel
Shar Dubey, CEO of Match Group
Tan Hock Eng, CEO of Broadcom, and highest earning CEO in the US in 2017
Amrapali Gan, CEO of OnlyFans
Sunil Garg, CEO of Citibank
Vishal Garg (businessman), CEO of Better.com
Rajat Gupta, former Worldwide Managing Director (chief executive) of McKinsey & Company
Daniel Ha, co-founder of Disqus
David T. Hon, founder of Dahon
Ming Hsieh, billionaire and philanthropist founder of Cogent Systems acquired by 3M 
Tony Hsieh, CEO of Zappos , internet entrepreneur and venture capitalist
Jen-Hsun Huang, billionaire co-founder and CEO of NVIDIA
Robert T. Huang, founder of Synnex
Shelly Hwang, co-founder of Pinkberry
Kai Huang, co-founder and CEO of Guitar Hero and RedOctane
Subrah Iyar, co-founder of Cisco Webex
David Ji, co-founder of Apex Digital
Andrea Jung, retired chairman and CEO of Avon Products
Johnny Kan, founder of Kan's Restaurant
Justin Kan, cofounder of Twitch
Min Kao, billionaire co-founder of Garmin
John Kapoor, billionaire founder of Insys
Jawed Karim, co-founder of YouTube
Farooq Kathwari, CEO of Ethan Allen (company)
Shahid Khan, billionaire president of Flex-N-Gate Corp., owner of the Jacksonville Jaguars
Tony Khan, CEO and co-founder of All Elite Wrestling
Vinod Khosla, billionaire co-founding CEO of Sun Microsystems and general partner of venture capital firm Kleiner, Perkins, Caufield & Byers
Hoang Kieu, billionaire Vietnamese-American owner of Shanghai RAAS Blood Products
Jeong H. Kim, co-founder and CEO, Yurie Systems (sold to Lucent for $1.1 billion)
James Kim, billionaire founder and executive chairman of Amkor Technology
George Kurian, CEO of NetApp
Arvind Krishna, CEO of IBM
David Lam, founder of Lam Research
Brian Lee, co-founder of LegalZoom, The Honest Company and ShoeDazzle
David Lee, founder of Jamison Services, largest real estate private office landlord in the country
Kai-Fu Lee, founding president of Google China
Noel Lee, founder of Monster Cable
Thai Lee, billionaire Thai-born Korean American co-founder and CEO of SHI International Corp , largest woman-owned business in the US
Christine Liang, president and founder of ASI Corp.
Kenneth Lin, co-founder of Credit Karma
Eric Ly, co-founder of LinkedIn, founder of Presdo Match
Kumar Malavalli, co-founder of Brocade Communications Systems
Sandeep Mathrani, CEO of WeWork
Milind Mehere, CEO and co-founder of Yieldstreet
Sanjay Mehrotra, co-founder of SanDisk, president and CEO of Micron Technology
Apoorva Mehta, co-founder of Instacart
Ivan Menezes, CEO of Diageo
Teresa H. Meng, founder of Atheros Communications acquired by Qualcomm and formed Qualcomm Atheros
Neal Mohan, CEO of YouTube
Moon Kook-jin, founder of Kahr Arms, manufacturer of the Desert Eagle
Bobby Murphy, billionaire co-founder of Snapchat
Satya Nadella, CEO of Microsoft
Laxman Narasimhan, Designated CEO of Starbucks
Shantanu Narayen, CEO of Adobe Systems
Indra Nooyi, chairman and CEO of PepsiCo
Dinesh Paliwal, CEO of Harman International
Milind Pant, CEO of Amway
Ellen Pao, former CEO of Reddit
James Park, co-founder and CEO of Fitbit
Vikram Pandit, president and CEO of Citigroup
Sundar Pichai, CEO of Google
Christine Poon, former vice chairman of Johnson & Johnson and worldwide chairman of J&J's Pharmaceuticals Group
Raghu Raghuram, CEO of VMware
Ritu Raj, founder of Wag Hotels
Raj Rajaratnam, billionaire founder of Galleon Group
Vivek Ranadivé, founder of TIBCO Software and owner of Sacramento Kings
Punit Renjen, CEO of Deloitte
Steve Sanghi, founder, chairman and CEO of Microchip Technology
Vivek Sankaran, CEO of Albertsons
Rohan Seth, co-founder of Clubhouse (app)
Niraj Shah, billionaire co-founder and CEO of Wayfair
Ram Shriram, billionaire co-founder of Junglee.com and early investor in Google
John J. Sie, founder of Starz Inc. 
Ben Silbermann, billionaire co-founder and CEO of Pinterest
Pradeep Sindhu, founder of Juniper Networks
Sumit Singh, CEO of Chewy (company)
Patrick Soon-Shiong, billionaire surgeon and founder of Abraxis BioScience and owner of the Los Angeles Times
K. R. Sridhar, founder and CEO of Bloom Energy
Lisa Su, president and CEO of Advanced Micro Devices
Raj Subramaniam, president and CEO of FedEx
Anjali Sud, CEO of Vimeo
David Sun, billionaire Taiwanese American co-founder of Kingston Technology
Rajeev Suri, CEO of Nokia
Sehat Sutardja, CEO of Marvell Technology Group
Sonia Syngal, CEO of Gap Inc.
Lip-Bu Tan, president and CEO of Cadence Design Systems
Wayne Ting, CEO of Lime
Janie Tsao, co-founder of Linksys
Victor Tsao, co-founder of Linksys
Greg Tseng, co-founder of Tagged
Kevin Tsujihara, chairman and CEO of Warner Bros.
John Tu, billionaire Taiwanese American co-founder of Kingston Technologies
Jayshree Ullal, CEO of Arista Networks
Romesh T. Wadhwani, billionaire founder of Symphony Technology Group
An Wang, founder of Wang Laboratories
Charles B. Wang, co-founder and former CEO of Computer Associates International, Inc.
Niniane Wang, technology executive
Roger Wang, billionaire founder chairman of Golden Eagle International Group
William Wang, billionaire Taiwanese American co-founder and CEO of Vizio
Padmasree Warrior, CEO of Fable and former CTO of Cisco and Motorola
Andrea Wong, president and CEO of Lifetime Networks
Yishan Wong, former CEO of Reddit
Sheryl WuDunn, won Pulitzer Prize at The New York Times in 1990; currently, an investment banker
Jeff Yang, co-founded A Magazine in 1989 and is a columnist for the San Francisco Chronicle.
Jerry Yang, Taiwanese American billionaire and co-founder and former CEO of Yahoo!
Bing Yeh, co-founder of Silicon Storage Technology, acquired by Microchip Technology and Greenliant Systems
Gideon Yu, co-owner of San Francisco 49ers and former CFO of Facebook and YouTube
Eric S. Yuan, billionaire founder and CEO of Zoom Video Communications, founding engineer at Webex, Ranked No. 1 of Top CEOs in 2018 of a large company on Glassdoor
Min Zhu, co-founder and former president and chief technical officer of WebEx.
Sheila Lirio Marcelo, founder and former CEO and chairwoman of Care.com.

Entertainment
Ruben A. Aquino, animation director, supervising animator for Walt Disney Animation Studios
Chang and Eng Bunker, (the source for the term "Siamese Twins")
Ping Chong, theater director, choreographer, video and installation artist
Shin Lim, close-up magician
Alain Nu, mentalist, magician

Actors and filmmakers

Keiko Agena, actress, Gilmore Girls
Philip Ahn, actor often considered the first Korean American in Hollywood
Aubrey Anderson-Emmons, actress, Modern Family
Aziz Ansari, actor and comedian, Human Giant and Parks and Recreation: Television series Funny People and I Love You, Man: Films
Lulu Antariksa, actress
Devon Aoki, actress and model
Tsuru Aoki (1892–1961), actress
Gregg Araki, filmmaker, Mysterious Skin, The Doom Generation
Geoffrey Arend, actor, Body of Proof
Ashley Argota, actress, True Jackson, VP
Reiko Aylesworth, actress, 24
Chloe Bennet (née Wang), actress, Agents of S.H.I.E.L.D. singer
Kayla Blake, actress
Moon Bloodgood, actress
Johnny Yong Bosch, actor
Dante Basco, actor, poet, dancer, Hook, The Debut, Biker Boyz and Take the Lead
Dion Basco, actor, The Debut, Biker Boyz and City Guys
Ross Butler, actor
Eric Byler, filmmaker
Steve Byrne, comedian and actor
Dean Cain, actor
David Callaham, screenwriter, producer
Tia Carrere, actress and singer, Relic Hunter, Wayne's World and Wayne's World 2
Christina Chang, actress
Katie Chang, actress, The Bling Ring
Wah Chang, prop designer, famous for designing the original Star Trek communicator and phasers
Rosalind Chao, actress
François Chau, actor
Joan Chen, actress, director
Lynn Chen, actress
Tina Chen, actress
Karin Anna Cheung, actress
Richard Chew, Academy Award-winning film editor
Ronny Chieng, comedian and actor, The Daily Show
Arden Cho, actress (Teen Wolf), YouTuber, model, singer
Henry Cho, comedian
John Cho, actor, FlashForward, Selfie, Better Luck Tomorrow, Harold & Kumar Go to White Castle, Star Trek
Margaret Cho, actress and comedian
Kenneth Choi, actor
Justin Chon, actor
Kelsey Chow, actress
Jamie Chung, actress
Peter Chung, animator, Aeon Flux
Michael Copon, actor
Eugene Cordero, actor
Billy Crawford, actor, host television
Destin Daniel Cretton, film director, screenwriter, producer, editor (Shang-Chi and the Legend of the Ten Rings)
Darren Criss, actor and singer
Tom Cross, Academy Award-winning film editor (for Whiplash)
Jake Cuenca, actor, model
Mark Dacascos, actor, of the Crying Freeman and the "Chairman" from Iron Chef America
Noureen DeWulf, actress, Starred in an Academy Award-winning short film
Ivan Dorschner, actor, model
James Duval, actor
Dayyan Eng, director, writer, producer (Bus 44, Waiting Alone, Inseparable)
Yvonne Elliman, singer
Roger Fan, actor
Nargis Fakhri, actress and model
Raja Fenske, actor
Janina Gavankar, actress
Kimiko Glenn, actress
Griffin Gluck, actor
Mark-Paul Gosselaar, actor, Saved by the Bell and NYPD Blue
Cynthia Gouw, actress, Star Trek V-The Final Frontier
Rene Gube, writer and actor
Todd Haberkorn, voice actor
Kayo Hatta (1958–2005), filmmaker
Sessue Hayakawa (1889–1973), Academy Award-nominated actor
Daniel Henney, actor in South Korea, X-Men Origins: Wolverine
Ryan Higa, YouTube personality
Steven Ho, stuntman, stunt coordinator, fight choreographer
James Hong, actor
James Wong Howe (1899–1976), two-time-Academy Award-winning cinematographer
Tiffany Ann Hsu, actress
Kelly Hu, actress
Tina Huang, stage and television actress
Vanessa Anne Hudgens, actress and singer
David Henry Hwang, Tony-winning playwright
Robert Ito, classic movie actor
Ken Jeong, comedian, actor, physician, The Hangover and Community
Malese Jow, actress and singer
Rodney Kageyama, actor
Mindy Kaling, actress, writer, producer, The Office
Michael Kang, filmmaker
Sung Kang, actor, Better Luck Tomorrow and Fast & Furious
Tim Kang, actor, The Mentalist
Ravi Kapoor, actor, Crossing Jordan
Archie Kao, actor, Power Rangers Lost Galaxy and CSI
Janice Kawaye, voice actress
Dai Sil Kim-Gibson, documentary filmmaker
Daniel Dae Kim, actor, Lost and Hawaii Five-0
Randall Duk Kim, actor
Matthew Yang King, actor and voice actor
Zach King, internet personality
Hayley Kiyoko, actress
Alex Ko, actor and filmmaker, Billy Elliot the Musical  and The Yellow Dress
Jo Koy, comedian
Shin Koyamada, actor, The Last Samurai and Wendy Wu: Homecoming Warrior
Lance Krall, actor and comedian
Michelle Krusiec, actress
Nancy Kwan, actress
Jennie Kwan, actress, California Dreams
Liza Lapira, actress
Cung Le, kickboxer, martial artist, and actor
Sharon Leal, actress, Guiding Light and Boston Public
Ang Lee, filmmaker and director, Brokeback Mountain, Hulk, Eat Drink Man Woman, Crouching Tiger Hidden Dragon
Bobby Lee, comedian and actor, MADtv and Reservation Dogs and Tiger Belly Podcast and Bad Friends Podcast
Brandon Lee (1965–1993), actor, son of Bruce Lee
Bruce Lee (1940–1973), martial arts superstar
Chris Chan Lee, filmmaker
C. S. Lee, actor, Dexter
James Kyson Lee, actor, Heroes
Jason Scott Lee, actor
Ki Hong Lee, actor, The Maze Runner, Unbreakable Kimmy Schmidt, Everything Before Us
Shannon Lee, actress, daughter of Bruce Lee
Lee Tung Foo, Vaudeville performer and actor
Will Yun Lee, actor, Witchblade and Bionic Woman
Ken Leung, actor, Lost, Shanghai Kiss and Star Wars: The Force Awakens
Matthew Libatique, Oscar-nominated cinematographer
Tiffany Limos, actress
Justin Lin, filmmaker, The Fast and the Furious: Tokyo Drift, Fast & Furious, Fast Five, Fast & Furious 6
Tao Lin, novelist and poet
Bai Ling, actress
Julia Ling, actress, Chuck
Lucy Liu, Chinese/American actress
Mako (1933–2006) Academy Award- and Tony Award-nominated actor, founder of East West Players
Aasif Mandvi, actor and comedian, The Daily Show
Dhar Mann, entrepreneur and YouTube personality
Marie Matiko, actress
Nobu McCarthy (1934–2002), actress
Mei Melancon, actress, writer and producer
Charles Melton, actor
Sam Milby, actor singer
Hasan Minhaj, actor, comedian, TV host
Vanessa Minnillo
Shay Mitchell, actress
Matthew Moy, comedian, actor, artist
Robert A. Nakamura, pioneering filmmaker, teacher, co-founder of Visual Communications (VC)
Aparna Nancherla, actress
Kumail Nanjiani, comedian and actor, Franklin & Bash
Minae Noji, actress, General Hospital
Paolo Montalban, actor of Filipino descent
Pat Morita (1932–2005), comedian and Academy Award-nominated actor best known for work on Happy Days and The Karate Kid
Olivia Munn, actress, model and television personality
Dr. Haing S. Ngor (1940–1996) won the Academy Award for Best Supporting Actor in 1985.
Dustin Nguyen, actor, 21 Jump Street and V.I.P.
Qui Nguyen, playwright, television writer, and screenwriter
Steve Nguyen, film producer
Julia Nickson, actress
Eva Noblezada, actress, singer
Rahsaan Noor, actor and filmmaker, Bengali Beauty
Sandra Oh, actress, Grey's Anatomy
Masi Oka, actor
Yuji Okumoto, actor, The Karate Kid Part II and Johnny Tsunami, writer and producer
Lisa Onodera, film producer
Maulik Pancholy, actor, Weeds and 30 Rock
Grace Park, actress, Battlestar Galactica, Edgemont, and Hawaii Five-0
Linda Park, actress, Star Trek: Enterprise
Randall Park, actor, comedian and writer, Fresh Off the Boat, The Interview and Everything Before Us
Steve Park, actor and comedian
Janel Parrish, actress and singer
Kal Penn, actor, Harold & Kumar Go to White Castle
Dat Phan, comedian, winner of the first season of Last Comic Standing
Ryan Potter, actor
Danny Pudi, actor, Community
Lou Diamond Phillips, actor
Lindsay Price, actress
Maggie Q, actress
Ke Huy Quan, actor
Sendhil Ramamurthy, actor, Heroes
Navi Rawat, actress, Numbers and The O.C.
Keanu Reeves, actor and philanthropist 
Ernie Reyes Jr., actor and martial arts expert
Rob Schneider, actor and comedian
Parry Shen, actor
Sheetal Sheth, actress
James Shigeta, actor
Sab Shimono, actor
Zenobia Shroff, actress and comedienne
Harry Shum Jr., actor
Shannyn Sossamon, actress
Brenda Song, actress
Sonja Sohn, actress, The Wire
Jack Soo, actor
Booboo Stewart, actor
Jiaoying Summers, comedian and actress
Pat Suzuki, actress and singer
Cary-Hiroyuki Tagawa, actor
Faran Tahir, actor
George Takei, actor of Star Trek fame, LGBT activist
Chris Tashima, actor, Academy Award-winning filmmaker
Brian Tee, actor,  Chicago Med
Jennifer Tilly, actress (born in California)
Meg Tilly, actress
Chuti Tiu, actress, Desire, 24, Dragnet, Beautiful, The Specials, former America's Junior Miss (first non-White winner)
Tamlyn Tomita, actress
Lauren Tom, voice actress
Kelly Marie Tran, Star Wars actress
Thalia Tran, actress
Thuy Trang, actress, Mighty Morphin Power Rangers (1973–2001)
Daisuke Tsuji, actor
Miyoshi Umeki, Oscar-winning actress and singer
Jenna Ushkowitz, actress
Dilshad Vadsaria, actress, Greek
Daya Vaidya, actress
Bee Vang, actor
Lalaine Vergara-Paras, actress and singer, Lizzie McGuire
Garrett Wang (王以瞻), actor on Star Trek: Voyager
Lulu Wang, filmmaker
Wayne Wang, film director, The Joy Luck Club
Miriam Weeks, pornographic actress
Ming-Na Wen, actress ER, Stargate Universe and As the World Turns
Anna May Wong (1905–1961), actress
BD Wong, Tony Award-winning actor, Oz and Law and Order: Special Victims Unit
Freddie Wong, filmmaker, musician, VFX artist, podcaster, and competitive gamer
Jimmy Wong, actor and musician
Russell Wong (王盛德), actor
Victor Wong (黃自強), Hollywood actor
Alice Wu, filmmaker
Constance Wu, Taiwanese American actress, Fresh Off the Boat and Crazy Rich Asians
Daniel Wu, actor, director and producer, Into the Badlands and Europa Report
Kevin Wu, YouTube personality
Leonard Wu, actor
Steven Yeun, actor, The Walking Dead
Aaron Yoo, actor, 21 and Everything Before Us
Keone Young, actor and voice actor
Jessica Yu, Oscar-winning film director
Kelvin Yu, actor and writer
Ron Yuan, actor and voice actor
Rick Yune, actor
Asa Akira, pornographic actress

Choreographers and dancers 
Stella Abrera, ballerina
Dana Tai Soon Burgess, cultural figure, choreographer, performance artist
Carrie Ann Inaba, dancer, choreographer
Michio Itō, choreographer
Sono Osato (1919–2018), ballerina

Music

 Keshi, lofi, hiphop, R&B, alternative, singer/songwriter/producer/instrumentalist

Jhené Aiko, singer-songwriter
Toshiko Akiyoshi, jazz pianist, composer/arranger, and bandleader
Nadia Ali, member of music group iiO
Tatyana Ali, Indo-Trinidadian singer and actress
Paul Anka, singer-songwriter
Steve Aoki electro house, musician, record producer and the founder of Dim Mak Records
Sameer Bhattacharya, guitarist in the Texas alternative rock band Flyleaf
Michelle Branch, singer-songwriter
Robert Campman, hip hop artist
Angelin Chang, Grammy Award-winning pianist and renown music professor
Jeff Chang, music critic and historian of hip-hop culture
Tim Chantarangsu, rapper, comedian, and videographer
China Mac, rapper and activist
Peter Chung, rapper and producer
Jocelyn Enriquez
Dia Frampton, former Meg & Dia singer
Ming Freeman, keyboardist/pianist
Lisa Furukawa, Japanese-American folk singer, songwriter, and pianist
Midori Gotō, classical violinist and recipient of the Avery Fisher Prize
Sameer Gadhia, lead singer of Young the Giant
Joseph Hahn, DJ in Linkin Park
Kirk Hammett, lead guitarist of Metallica
Matt Heafy, guitarist and vocal of band Trivium
Nichkhun Horvejkul, member of South Korean boy group 2PM
Magdalen Hsu-Li, out bisexual Chinese American singer-songwriter recording artist, poet and artist.
Chad Hugo, musician and producer, member of The Neptunes and N.E.R.D.
Hao Huang (pianist), pianist and professor at Scripps College
William Hung, contestant from American Idol
Tiffany Hwang, Korean American member of girl group SNSD.
Ramon Ibanga, Jr., hip hop producer
Enrique Iglesias, mother, Isabel Preysler, is Filipino
James Iha, formerly the guitarist of The Smashing Pumpkins
Vijay Iyer, pianist
Jon Jang, jazz pianist, composer, and bandleader
Clarence Jey, Grammy, Billboard credited songwriter, record producer
MC Jin, pioneer in the Asian-American hip-hop scene
Norah Jones, musician, Grammy Award winner, daughter of Ravi Shankar.
Jessica Jung, Korean American member of girl group SNSD.
Krystal Jung, member of South Korean girl group f(x)
Nicole Jung, member of South Korean girl group KARA
Scott Jung, (Also known as The Magnificent Butcher) hip hop producer, rapper
Tony Kanal, Two-time Grammy Award winner, bass player for No Doubt.
Michael Kang (musician), mandolin player, violinist, and vocalist for String Cheese Incident, is South Korean.
Jeff Kashiwa, smooth jazz saxophonist
Natalise Kalea, Burmese-Chinese singer
Dennis Kim, underground rapper and spoken word artist
Eli Kim, member of South Korean boy group U-KISS
Siddhartha Khosla, lead singer of Goldspot
Raja Kumari, singer, rapper and songwriter
Sunny Lee, Korean American member of girl group SNSD
Amber Josephine Liu, member of South Korean girl group f(x)
Nora Lum, rapper known as Awkwafina
Yo-Yo Ma, renowned cellist
Baiyu, singer-songwriter
Bruno Mars, singer-songwriter music producer
Nancy McDonie, member of girl group Momoland
Zubin Mehta, conductor, New York Philharmonic Orchestra
Nicki Minaj, Indo-Trinidadian rap artist 
Charles Mingus, jazz double bassist, composer, band leader
Daniel Nakamura, hip hop producer and founder of 75 Ark
Eric Nam, Korean-American singer, active in South Korea under B2M Entertainment.
Martin Nievera, singer-songwriter and TV host
Justin Nozuka, singer-songwriter
Karen O, singer of Yeah Yeah Yeahs
Kero One, hip hop MC and producer
Seiji Ozawa, Boston Symphony Conductor
Will Pan, singer-songwriter
Jay Park, Korean-American singer, rapper, bboy & actor. Also famous in South Korea as the former leader of South Korean boyband 2 pm.
Jonathan Park, rapper and actor
Lena Park, composer, singer-songwriter
Mike Park, was the singer of Skankin Pickle and currently runs Asian Man Records
Allan Pineda (Lindo) of The Black Eyed Peas
Richard Quitevis, turntablist and composer
A. R. Rahman, Grammy Award-winning composer/arranger, songwriter, and music producer
Larry Ramos, guitarist, banjo player, and vocalist with the 1960s American pop band the Association.
Mike Relm, scratch video DJ who has toured with the Blue Man Group
Olivia Rodrigo, singer-songwriter and actress
Amerie Mi Marie Rogers, R&B/pop singer
Kelis Rogers, R&B singer
Nicole Scherzinger, singer and former member of The Pussycat Dolls.
Laura Shigihara, singer, songwriter, and programmer
Shing02, recording artist known as Shingo Annen
Mike Shinoda co-founder of Linkin Park
Shaffer Chimere Smith, R&B singer-songwriter, and actor
Rajé Shwari, singer
Michael Stevenson, rapper
Vienna Teng, folk and pop singer-songwriter
Kim Thayil, guitarist for Grammy Award-winning rock group Soundgarden
Mark Tuan, member of South Korean boyband Got7
Hikaru Utada, Japanese-American singer-songwriter active in both Japan and United States; her single Devil Inside topped the U.S. Billboard Dance Chart.
Alex and Eddie Van Halen, members of rock band Van Halen, whose mother was of Indonesian ancestry
Casandra Ventura, R&B singer
Only Won, rapper, beatboxer, actor, filmmaker (first bilingual Chinese American rapper)
Kevin Woo, member of South Korean boy group U-KISS
Vanness Wu, singer-songwriter & rapper
Catalina Yue, Chinese-Japanese-American pop singer-songwriter
Brandon Jermaine Yun, rapper and former radio personality
Joanna Wang, singer-songwriter
Leehom Wang, Taiwanese American singer-songwriter, record producer, and actor
Gabriella Sarmiento Wilson, singer-songwriter
Shawn Wasabi, producer and electronic instrument designer

Groups/bands
Aziatix, R&B, pop, soul, hip hop group
Blue Scholars
Far East Movement, first Asian-American group to be in the Top 10 in Mainstream Pop charts
Fort Minor
IAMMEDIC
KeyKool & DJ Rhettmatic, pioneer Asian American hip hop group
Mountain Brothers, hip hop group
Paperdoll, indie band from NYC fronted by Asian American Teresa Lee
Royal Pirates, Korean-American rock band
The Slants, first all Asian American dance rock band/victors in a major U.S. Supreme Court case

Reality TV participants
 Natalie Anderson – The Amazing Race contestant and Survivor: San Juan del Sur winner
 Nadiya Anderson – The Amazing Race and Survivor: San Juan del Sur contestant
 Raj Bhakta – The Apprentice 2 contestant
 Yau-Man Chan – Survivor: Fiji contestant
 Jamie Chung – house mate on MTV's The Real World: San Diego.
 Catherine Giudici – The Bachelor (season 17) winner
 Christine Ha – MasterChef season 3 winner
 Angelica Hale – America's Got Talent (season 12) runner-up
 Maria Ho – The Amazing Race 15 contestant
 Ken Hoang – Survivor: Gabon contestant.
 James Holzhauer – Jeopardy! champion. Holzhauer's grandmother was Japanese.
 Hung Huynh – Top Chef (season 3) winner
 Jabbawockeez – Winners of America's Best Dance Crew (season 1)
 Tammy and Victor Jih – winners of The Amazing Race 14
 Zach King – The Amazing Race 28
 Kristen Kish – Top Chef (season 11) winner
 Yul Kwon – Survivor: Cook Islands winner
 Kodi Lee – America's Got Talent (season 14) winner
 Sanjaya Malakar – American Idol (season 6) finalist
 Poreotics – Winners of America's Best Dance Crew (season 5)
 Quest Crew – Winners of America's Best Dance Crew (season 3)
 Jessica Sanchez – American Idol (season 11) runner up
 James Sun – The Apprentice 6 runner-up
 Tila Tequila – A Shot at Love with Tila Tequila star
 Jasmine Trias – American Idol (season 3) finalist
 Elyse Umemoto – Survivor: South Pacific contestant
 Kevin Wu – The Amazing Race 17 contestant
Albert Tsai, American actor 
Ian Chen,American actor

Fashion
Tyson Beckford, model and actor
Malan Breton, fashion designer
Richard Chai, fashion designer
Angel Chang, fashion designer
Wenlan Chia, fashion designer
Doug Chiang, movie design and fashion designer
Monika Chiang, fashion designer
Jimmy Choo, fashion designer and founder of Jimmy Choo Ltd
Doo-Ri Chung, fashion designer
Chloe Dao, fashion designer and winner of Project Runway (season 2)
Diana Eng, fashion designer and contestant on Project Runway (season 2)
Karenina Sunny Halim, model
Joe Allen Hong, fashion designer for Neiman Marcus
Chanel Iman, supermodel with Korean and African American descent
Jen Kao, fashion designer
Naeem Khan, fashion designer
Derek Lam, fashion designer
Humberto Leon and Carol Lim, fashion designers and retailers
Phillip Lim, fashion designer
Monique Lhuillier, fashion designer
Jay Manuel, creative director and make-up artist
Kelsey Merritt, fashion model
Josie Natori, fashion designer
Jeff Ng, fashion designer and creator of Staple Design
Mary Ping, fashion designer
Cynthia Sakai, fashion designer
Kimora Lee Simmons, supermodel with Japanese and African American descent
Peter Som, fashion designer
Anna Sui, fashion designer
Vivienne Tam, fashion designer
Chrissy Teigen, model, TV host
Alexander Wang, fashion designer
Vera Wang, fashion designer
Jason Wu, fashion designer
Luly Yang, fashion designer
Prabal Gurung, fashion designer

Culinary
 David Chang, founder of the Momofuku restaurant group and in multiple television shows 
 Joyce Chen, popularized northern-style Chinese cuisine in the United States
 Cecilia Chiang (江孫芸), founder of the Mandarin Restaurant. Chiang's son, Philip Chiang, is the co-founder of restaurant chain P. F. Chang's China Bistro
 Roy Choi, creator of the gourmet Korean taco truck, Kogi
Cristeta Comerford, White House Executive Chef, won with Bobby Flay in an Iron Chef America challenge
 Soleil Ho, chef, food writer, host of podcast "The Racist Sandwich", and restaurant critic
 Eddie Huang, chef and author of Fresh Off the Boat
 Madhur Jaffrey, James Beard award-winning food and travel writer, and television personality
 Padma Lakshmi, cookbook author and host of Top Chef and Host of "Taste the Nation with Padma Lakshmi"
 Francis Lam, host of The Splendid Table and food journalist
 Emily Kim, creator and host of popular YouTube channel Maangchi, teaching Korean cooking
 Niki Nakayama, chef and owner of Michelin-starred n/naka restaurant
 Jet Tila, celebrity chef and restaurateur and guest on “Cutthroat Kitchen”
 Ming Asai (蔡明), chef and restaurateur (Blue Ginger); host of Emmy Award-winning television show East Meets West
 Roy Yamaguchi, owner of Roy's Restaurants
 Martin Yan, chef and food writer, hosted his award-winning PBS-TV cooking show Yan Can Cook since 1982
 Jennifer Yee, award-winning, James Beard, nominated pastry chef
 Molly Yeh, cookbook author and blogger

Law

Preeta D. Bansal, Solicitor General for the State of New York (1999–2002).
Norman Bay, U.S. Attorney for the District of New Mexico (2000–2002), and the first Chinese-American to hold such a U.S. Attorney position.
Morgan Chu, prominent litigator and former Managing Partner of Irell & Manella.
Viet D. Dinh, United States Assistant Attorney General and a key drafter of what became the USA PATRIOT Act.
Heather Fong, chief of police of San Francisco Police Department, and the first Asian American woman to head a major metropolitan police department.
Noel Francisco, 47th Solicitor General of the United States
Judge.James C. Ho, lawyer, Juris Doctor of Texas general judge on Texas appeal & for Texas judge weddings permition
Robert K. Hur, current U.S. Attorney for the District of Maryland.
Todd Kim, first Solicitor General for the District of Columbia.
Harold Hongju Koh, dean of Yale Law School (July 1, 2004 – March 23, 2009).
Arsalan Iftikhar, international human rights lawyer, founder of TheMuslimGuy
Lance Ito, judge in the OJ Simpson trial.
Yuri Kochiyama, civil rights activist.
Fred Korematsu, prominent resister of Japanese American internment.
Carol Lam, U.S. Attorney for the Southern District of California (2002–2007)
David Lat, attorney and blogger for the sites "Underneath Their Robes" and "Above the Law."
William F. Lee, co-managing partner of the international law firm of WilmerHale.
Jessie K. Liu, current U.S. Attorney for the District of Columbia
Dale Minami, attorney who helped reverse Fred Korematsu's criminal conviction.
Paul Tanaka, former mayor of Gardena, California and undersheriff of the Los Angeles County Sheriff's Department.
Rachel Paulose, U.S. Attorney for the District of Minnesota. She is the first Indian American woman, the youngest attorney, and the first woman in Minnesota to hold this post.
Simon Tam, author, activist, and founder of The Slants; litigant in Matal v. Tam.
Mary Tape, desegregation activist who fought for Chinese-Americans' access to education, notably in the case Tape v. Hurley in 1885.
Frank H. Wu, distinguished professor and chancellor & dean of UC Hastings; dean of Wayne State University Law School.
Bruce Yamashita, attorney and U.S. Marine Corps officer who worked to expose racial discrimination within the Corps.
Debra Wong Yang, U.S. Attorney for the Central District of California, and the first Asian American female to serve as a U.S. Attorney.
Minoru Yasui, World War II-era lawyer who fought the legality of the incarceration of Japanese Americans during the war. Posthumously awarded the Presidential Medal of Freedom in 2015.

Literature

 Alfredo Alcala – Filipino comic book artist.
 Peter Bacho – author of the American Book Award-winning novel Cebu
 Lynda Barry – cartoonist of partial Filipino descent, most known for Ernie Pook's Comeek and Marlys, published in Salon.com and other independent papers.
 Carlos Bulosan – author, "America Is In the Heart."
 Regie Cabico – notable slam poet and performer
 Jorge Cham – author of PhD Comics
 Ernie Chan – comic book artist/inker for Marvel Comics and DC Comics.
 Eileen Chang – writer
 Lan Samantha Chang – writer; director of the Iowa Writer's Workshop
 Cherry Chevapravatdumrong – writer, Family Guy
 Frank Chin (趙健秀) – novelist, playwright, and essayist
 Kah Kyung Cho – philosopher at SUNY University
 Amy Chua – writer and Harvard professor
 Melissa de la Cruz – author of teen lit series Au Pairs, The Ashleys and Blue Bloods
 Tony DeZuniga – co-creator of Jonah Hex
 Ben Fee – writer and labor organizer
 Don Figueroa – comic book artist for IDW Publishing and Dreamwave Entertainment, working on various Transformers titles.
 Larry Hama – comic book writer for Marvel, DC, IDW Publishing, creator of G.I. Joe filecards.
 Tanuja Desai Hidier – author of Born Confused
 David Henry Hwang (黃哲倫) – playwright
 Lawson Fusao Inada - poet, winner of the American Book Award and former poet laureate of Oregon
 Gish Jen – writer, novelist
 Ha Jin – novelist, winner of the National Book Award for "Waiting"
 Cynthia Kadohata - author of children's books, recipient of the Newbery Medal (2005) and National Book Award for Young People's Literature (2013)
 Rafael Kayanan – Comics artist, TV writer and master level instructor in Sayoc Kali.
 Jaegwon Kim – philosopher at Brown University
 Maxine Hong Kingston – writer, novelist, recipient of the 2008 National Book Foundation's Medal for Distinguished Contribution to American Letters
 Jean Kwok – writer, novelist
 Jhumpa Lahiri – Pulitzer Prize-winning author
 Gus Lee (李健孫) – writer
 Jim Lee – DC Comics writer, artist, editor and publisher
 Huping Ling – history professor, award-winning author, Executive Editor for the Journal of Asian American Studies
 Bette Bao Lord (包柏漪) – writer, novelist
 David Wong Louie – writer
 Adeline Yen Mah (馬嚴君玲) – author and physician
 Nick Manabat – creator of Cybernary, comic book artist for Wildstorm Productions
 Gary R. Mar – philosopher at Stony Brook University
 William Marr (馬為義, 非馬) – engineer, poet, translator, and artist
 Janice Mirikitani - former poet laureate for San Francisco
 Kenn Navarro – animator of cartoon Happy Tree Friends
 Aimee Nezhukumatathil – award-winning poet and professor
 Han Ong – playwright and author; recipient of MacArthur Foundation "genius" grant.
 Pai Hsien-yung – Chinese Muslim writer
 Linda Sue Park – American-born author; winner of the 2002 Newbery Medal for A Single Shard
 Whilce Portacio – created Bishop of the X-Men, co-founder of Image Comics.
 Randy Romero – writer
 Albert Saijo – poet
 Saumitra Saxena – award-winning poet in the modern Indian history. Graduated from Indian Institute of Technology and received his PhD from the University of Illinois at Chicago.
 Lisa See – writer
 T. K. Seung – philosopher and literary critic at University of Texas, Austin
 Kamila Shamsie – award-winning novelist of books such as Salt and Saffron and Broken Verses.
 Eileen Tabios – poet.
 Ronald Takaki – was an academic, historian, ethnographer and author and recipient of the Anisfield-Wolf Book Award in 1994
 Amy Tan – best-selling author of The Joy Luck Club, The Bonesetter's Daughter, The Kitchen God's Wife, etc.
 Romeo Tanghal – comic book artist.
 Bryan Thao Worra – award-winning Lao American writer, 1st Lao American NEA Fellow in Literature.
 Alex Tizon – Pulitzer Prize winner.
 Dr. Abraham Verghese – noted Doctor and Author; In My Own Country and My Tennis Partner
 Jose Garcia Villa – poet, writer, generationalist; pre-Beat Generation influence.
 Raees Warsi – notable poet, author and TV anchor
 Michi Weglyn - author and recipient of the Anisfield-Wolf Book Award in 1977
 Jade Snow Wong – writer
 Shawn Wong – novelist, "Americanese" and "Homebase"
 Timothy C. Wong (黃宗泰) – sinologist, translator, and literary theorist
 Hisaye Yamamoto - short story writer, recipient of the American Book Award for Lifetime Achievement in 1986
 Karen Tei Yamashita - author and playwright, recipient of the 2021 National Book Foundation's Medal for Distinguished Contribution to American Letters
 Gene Luen Yang – graphic novelist
 Taro Yashima - author of children's books, recipient of the 1955 Children's Book Award 
 Laurence Yep (叶祥添) – author of children's books
 Charles Yu - novelist and winner of the 2020 National Book Award for Fiction
 Connie Young Yu – writer and historian 
 Judy Yung – writer

Military

Individuals

 Leandro Aragoncillo – gunnery sergeant, U.S. Marine Corps. Convicted of spying against the United States Government
 Raquel C. Bono – rear admiral (lower half), U.S. Navy. Command Surgeon, United States Pacific Command
 Jose Calugas – captain, U.S. Army. Medal of Honor recipient, World War II
 Joseph Caravalho – brigadier general, U.S. Army. Commanding General, Brooke Army Medical Center
 Ming Chang – rear admiral (upper half), U.S. Navy, retired. Department of Navy Inspector General, 1987–1990
 Dan Choi – first lieutenant, U.S. Army. Gay rights advocate.
 David S. C. Chu – captain, U.S. Army. Under Secretary of Defense for Personnel and Readiness (2001–2008), President/CEO of the Institute for Defense Analyses
 John M. Cho – brigadier general, U.S. Army. First Korean American general officer; former commander, Western Regional Medical Command
 Gordon Pai'ea Chung-Hoon – rear admiral (upper half), U.S. Navy. First Asian American citizen graduate from United States Naval Academy; first Asian American flag officer
 Anatolio B. Cruz – rear admiral (lower half), U.S. Navy. Deputy Commander, United States Fourth Fleet
 Susan Ahn Cuddy – lieutenant, U.S. Navy. First female Gunnery Officer in the navy
 John R. D'Araujo Jr. – major general, U.S. Army. First Filipino American to be promoted to a general officer rank. Former Director of the Army National Guard Bureau. Former Director of the Recovery Division for the Federal Emergency Management Agency (FEMA).
 Rudolph Davila – first lieutenant, U.S. Army. Medal of Honor Recipient, World War II
 John Liu Fugh – major general, U.S. Army, retired. First Chinese American officer to be promoted to a general officer rank in the United States Army; first Chinese American to serve as Judge Advocate General of the Army
 Barney F. Hajiro – private, U.S. Army. Medal of Honor recipient in World War II
 Harry B. Harris Jr. – admiral, U.S. Navy. First Asian American to achieve the rank of a four-star admiral.
 Mikio Hasemoto – private, U.S. Army. Posthumous Medal of Honor recipient in World War II
 Joe Hayashi – private, U.S. Army. Posthumous Medal of Honor recipient in World War II
 Shizuya Hayashi – private, U.S. Army. Medal of Honor recipient in World War II
 Oscar Hilman – brigadier general, U.S. Army, retired.
 Daniel Inouye – captain, U.S. Army. Senator from Hawaii, Medal of Honor recipient World War II
 Theodore Kanamine – United States Army brigadier general
 Terry Teruo Kawamura – sergeant first class, U.S. Army. Posthumous Medal of Honor recipient in Vietnam War
 Andrew Kim, former head of CIA's Korea Mission Center
Young-Oak Kim – colonel, U.S. Army. First ethnic minority to lead a U.S. Army Battalion
 Yeiki Kobashigawa – second lieutenant, U.S. Army. Medal of Honor recipient in World War II
 Wah Kau Kong – second lieutenant, U.S. Army Air Corps. First Chinese American fighter pilot
 Alice K. Kurashige – captain, U.S. Marine Corps. First Japanese American woman to be commissioned in the United States Marine Corps
 Robert T. Kuroda – staff sergeant, U.S. Army. Posthumous Medal of Honor recipient in World War II
 Ben Kuroki – technical sergeant, U.S. Army Air Corps. Only Japanese American Army Air Force pilot to fly combat missions in the Pacific theater in World War II
 Hazel Ying Lee (李月英) – civilian, Women Airforce Service Pilot (WASP). First Chinese American woman to earn a pilot's license; flew for the United States Army Air Forces during World War II
 Kurt Lee – major, US Marine Corps. First Asian American marine corps officer, Navy Cross recipient
 Brian L. Losey – rear admiral (lower half), U.S. Navy. Navy SEAL, and Commander of U.S. Special Operations Command, Africa (SOCAFRICA); Japanese American and first Asian American SEAL flag officer
 Viet Luong – major general, U.S. Army. First Vietnam-born general officer.
 Ron J. Maclaren – rear admiral (lower half), U.S. Navy. Director, Joint Contingency Acquisition Support Office; Filipino American
 Eleanor Mariano – rear admiral (lower half), U.S. Navy, retired. First Filipino American to be promoted to a flag officer rank. Former White House physician
 Susan K. Mashiko – major general, U.S. Air Force
 Roy Matsumoto – master sergeant, U.S. Army.  Member of Merrill's Marauders, and an inductee of the U.S. Army Rangers Hall Of Fame and the Military Intelligence Corps Hall of Fame
 Spark Matsunaga – captain, U.S. Army. Senator from Hawaii, 1977–1990
 Hiroshi Miyamura – staff sergeant, U.S. Army. Medal of Honor recipient in Korean War
 Kenneth P. Moritsugu – rear admiral (upper half), U.S. Public Health Service. Former acting Surgeon General of the United States
 Kaoru Moto – private first class, U.S. Army. Medal of Honor recipient in World War II
 Sadao Munemori – private first class, U.S. Army. Posthumous Medal of Honor recipient in World War II
 Kiyoshi K. Muranaga – private first class, U.S. Army. Posthumous Medal of Honor recipient in World War II
 Michael K. Nagata – lieutenant general, U.S. Army
 Masato Nakae – private first class, U.S. Army. Medal of Honor recipient in World War II
 Shinyei Nakamine – private, U.S. Army. Posthumous Medal of Honor recipient in World War II
 William K. Nakamura – private first class, U.S. Army. Posthumous Medal of Honor recipient in World War II
 Paul M. Nakasone – U.S. Army four-star general, 3rd commander of the United States Cyber Command and 18th director of the National Security Agency
 Joe M. Nishimoto – private first class, U.S. Army. Posthumous Medal of Honor recipient in World War II
 José B. Nísperos – private, U.S. Army. First Asian American Medal of Honor recipient
 Allan M. Ohata – captain, U.S. Army. Medal of Honor recipient in World War II
 Fred Ohr – captain, U.S. Army Air Corps. To date, only Korean American fighter ace
 James K. Okubo – technician fifth grade, U.S. Army. Posthumous Medal of Honor recipient in World War II
 Yukio Okutsu – technical sergeant, U.S. Army. Medal of Honor recipient in World War II
 Allen K. Ono – lieutenant general, U.S. Army, retired. First Japanese American lieutenant general; first Asian American lieutenant general
 Frank H. Ono – private first class, U.S. Army. Posthumous Medal of Honor recipient in World War II
 Kazuo Otani – staff sergeant, U.S. Army. Posthumous Medal of Honor recipient in World War II
 Quang X. Pham – major, U.S. Marine Corps. First Vietnamese American naval aviator.
 Coral Wong Pietsch – brigadier general, U.S. Army Reserve, retired. First female Asian American general officer in the US Army.
 Eldon Regua – major general, U.S. Army Reserve. Commanding General, 75th Division (BCTD). Only  Filipino American general officer.
 George T. Sakato – private, U.S. Army. Medal of Honor recipient in World War II
 Eric Shinseki – general, U.S. Army, retired. Chief of Staff of the United States Army, 1999–2003; Secretary of Veterans Affairs, 2009–present. Highest-ranked Asian American, to have served in the United States military
 Elmelindo Rodrigues Smith – sergeant first class, U.S. Army. Posthumous Medal of Honor recipient in Vietnam War
 Edward Soriano – lieutenant general, U.S. Army, retired. Former Commanding General of I Corps. Highest ranked Filipino American, to have served in the United States military
 Ramon S. Subejano – private first class, U.S. Army. Silver Star recipient in World War II
 Benigno G. Tabora – sergeant major, U.S. Army. Purple Heart recipient, World War II
 Antonio Taguba – major general, U.S. Army, retired. Author of the Taguba Report
 Ted T. Tanouye – technical sergeant, U.S. Army. Posthumous Medal of Honor recipient in World War II
 Sue Mi Terry, CIA intelligence analyst specializing in East Asia
 Bhagat Singh Thind – private, U.S. Army. Enlisted in Army during World War I, was an acting Sergeant during training, honorably discharged at the end of the war.
 Telesforo Trinidad – fireman second class, U.S. Navy. Only Asian American naval recipient of the Medal of Honor
 Eleanor Valentin – rear admiral (lower half), Medical Corps, U.S. Navy. Commander, Naval Medical Support Command
 Francis B. Wai – captain, U.S. Army. Only Chinese American to have been awarded the Medal of Honor
 Ehren Watada – first lieutenant, U.S. Army. First officer Operation Iraqi Freedom objector
 Mun Charn Wong – lieutenant colonel, U.S. Air Force. Pilot, World War II
 Ted Wong – major general, U.S. Army. 26th chief of the U.S. Army Dental Corps
 Bruce Yamashita – captain, U.S. Marine Corps Reserves, retired. Worked to expose racial discrimination
 Xiong Yan – captain, U.S. Army. Chaplain, former Chinese dissident
 Rodney James Takashi Yano – sergeant first class, U.S. Army. Posthumous Medal of Honor recipient in Vietnam War
 James Yee – captain, U.S. Army. Muslim Chaplain previously charged with Sedition
 John C. Young – colonel, U.S. Army, combat liaison officer, CBI, WWII

Foreign military service 
 Arthur Chin (陳瑞鈿) – major, National Revolutionary Army. World War II pilot and fighter ace with Canton Provincial Air Force
 Ma Dunjing – major general, National Revolutionary Army. Chinese Muslim immigrated to Los Angeles in the United States after retirement in 1950
 Ma Hongkui – lieutenant general, National Revolutionary Army. Chinese Muslim immigrated to Los Angeles in the United States after retirement in 1950
 Nobuaki Iwatake – conscript, Imperial Japanese Army.
 Nguyễn Ngọc Loan – brigadier general, Army of the Republic of Vietnam. Subject of Eddie Adam's photograph
 Vang Pao, – major general, Royal Lao Army. Hmong Leader, commander of CIA-supported Hmong forces during the Laotian Civil War
 Ngo Quang Truong – lieutenant general, Army of the Republic of Vietnam. Author
 Usman Zach Khattak – Private first class, is a Pakistani American serving in US military 539th transportation division

Units
 1st & 2nd Filipino Infantry Regiments – segregated units predominately Filipino American units of World War II
 5217th Reconnaissance Battalion – unit which drew soldiers from the 1st and 2nd Filipino Infantry Regiments for armed reconnaissance in the Philippines, and assisted resistance efforts
 442nd Regimental Combat Team – highly decorated Asian American unit of World War II
 Military Intelligence Service – Unit primarily composed of Japanese-American linguists during World War II
 Philippine Scouts – segregated Filipino American Army units from 1901 to 1946
 12th Infantry Division – division composed of Regular Army and Philippine Scouts soldiers from 1921 to 1947
 26th Cavalry Regiment – last U.S. cavalry regiment to engage in horse-mounted warfare
  – Interwar period destroyer with a primarily Filipino American crew

News/media/journalism
 Guy Aoki – founder of Media Action Network for Asian Americans
 Ben Calhoun – radio journalist at This American Life
 Cher Calvin News Anchor 
 Jeff Chang – journalist, hip-hop historian
 Laura Chang – science editor, The New York Times
 Christine Chen – Emmy Award-winning journalist and news anchor
 Julie Chen Moonves – newsreader on The Early Show and host of Big Brother
 Lanhee Chen – American policy expert, academic and CNN political commentator
 Anna Chen Chennault (陳香梅) – journalist, notable in American public life; also, wife of Claire Chennault – of the Flying Tigers
 Kiran Chetry – television news anchor
 Connie Chung – anchor and journalist, 2 Emmy Awards for Best Interviewer
 Ann Curry – anchor and correspondent for NBC News and The Today Show
 Veronica De La Cruz – CNN News anchor
Cynthia Gouw – award-winning television and radio reporter/anchor
 Sanjay Gupta – CNN senior medical correspondent
 Joseph Heco (1837–1897) – fisherman, writer, first to publish a Japanese language newspaper
 Ching He Huang – cooking show host
 Philip Jaisohn – journalist, activist, the first Korean to become a naturalized citizen of the United States
 Pedram Javaheri – meteorologist for CNN International & HLN
 JT Tran – featured dating advice columnist for LA Weekly and Baller Magazine
 Michiko Kakutani – Pulitzer Prize winning New York Times literary critic and author
K. Connie Kang – first female Korean American journalist, wrote for Los Angeles Times
  Ken Kashiwahara  – first Asian American network news anchor, Emmy-winning television journalist
 Guy Kawasaki – author, Apple evangelist
 Mina Kimes – journalist, ESPN commentator
 Gobind Behari Lal – science journalist and the first Asian American Pulitzer prize winner
 Euna Lee – journalist
 Jennifer 8. Lee – journalist, The New York Times
 K. W. Lee – journalist, founder of the Korean American Journalists Association
 Young Jean Lee – playwright, director, and filmmaker
 Carol Lin – news anchor
 Sam Chu Lin – journalist, one of the first Asian Americans on network TV news
 Lisa Ling (凌志慧) – journalist, known for her role as a co-host of ABC's The View and host of National Geographic Ultimate Explorer documentarian for CNN
 Richard Lui – news anchor of MSNBC
 Michelle Malkin – Fox News reporter and author
 Vinita Nair – current anchor of World News Now and America This Morning on ABC.
 Kent Ninomiya – anchor, reporter, news executive
 Uma Pemmaraju – Fox News Channel senior news anchor
 Dith Pran – photojournalist. The Killing Fields was based on his life.
 Aneesh Raman – CNN Middle East correspondent
 Scott Sassa – former President of NBC West Coast
 Sharon Tay – journalist
 Iva Toguri (1916–2006) – radio broadcaster who has been nicknamed "Tokyo Rose"
 Kaity Tong – television news anchor, WPIX-TV
 Lin Sue Cooney – news anchor 12 News
 Ben Fong-Torres (方振豪) – journalist, Rolling Stone
 Stephanie Trong – journalist, former Executive Editor, Jane Magazine; current Executive Editor Nylon Magazine
 Ali Velshi – CNN business anchor
 Zain Verjee – CNN anchor
 Michael Yamashita – president/CEO and publisher of Bay Area Reporter
 John Yang (journalist) – Peabody Award-winning news correspondent and commentator for NBC Nightly News with Brian Williams, Today (NBC program) and MSNBC
 Jeff Yang – writer, media/business consultant, Asian American culture columnist for the San Francisco Chronicle
 Al Young - journalist; first Asian American sportswriter in U.S. Mainland at metro daily newspaper with Bridgeport (CT) Post-Telegram in 1970.
 Anthony Yuen – journalist
 Fareed Zakaria – editor of Newsweek, host of Fareed Zakaria GPS on CNN

Politics

Daniel Akaka, elected to the U.S. Senate from Hawaii in 1990.
George Ariyoshi, became the first Asian American governor in the United States when he was elected Governor of Hawaii in 1974.
Larry Asera, first Filipino American elected in the continental United States
Kumar Barve, became the first Indian-American in U.S. history elected to a state legislative body in 1990 and currently serves as the Majority Leader of the Maryland House of Delegates.
Rob Bonta, California Attorney General
Thelma Buchholdt, became the first Filipina American legislator and the first Filipino American legislator elected to office outside of Hawaii in 1974. She was elected by a constituency which was less than 1% Asian American, and served four terms in the Alaska state legislature.
Anh "Joseph" Cao, became the first Vietnamese American Congressman as a Representative for Louisiana in 2008.
Ben Cayetano, elected Governor of Hawaii in 1994.
Elaine Chao, became the first Asian American woman and the first Chinese American in the U.S. Cabinet when George W. Bush, appointed her Secretary of Labor in 2001.
David S. Chang, first Korean-American to chair a major state political party
Stephanie Chang, first Asian American woman to serve in the Michigan Legislature; current State senator representing Michigan's 1st District.
 David L. Chew, appointed the White House Staff Secretary by President Ronald Reagan in 1985. It is the highest position in the Executive Office of the President held by an Asian American.
John Chiang, 33rd California State Treasurer, 31st California State Controller and former California Board of Equalization
Upendra J. Chivukula, became the first Asian American elected to the New Jersey General Assembly in 2002.
Judy Chu, first Chinese American woman elected to the U.S. Congress. U.S. House of Representatives from California's 27th district
Steven Chu, 12th United States Secretary of Energy from 2009 to 2013
Sada Cumber, first United States Ambassador to the OIC
Charles Djou, major, U.S. Army. Former Congressman from Hawaii.
 Tammy Duckworth, major, U.S. Army. Former Assistant Secretary of Public and Intergovernmental Affairs for the United States Department of Veterans Affairs. First Asian American woman elected to Congress in Illinois.
Mervyn Dymally, representative from California
Hiram Fong became the first Asian American elected to the U.S. Senate in 1959.
Allan Fung, of Chinese descent, First Asian-American elected as Mayor in Rhode Island, prominent lawyer. 
Dr. Josh Green, Lt. Governor politician of Hawaii and Hawaii doctor
Nikki Haley, of Indian descent, was the governor of South Carolina and first Asian American woman governor.
Colleen Hanabusa, Congresswoman from Hawaii
Bruce Harrell, Mayor of Seattle
Harry B. Harris Jr, ambassador and diplomat
Kamala Harris, 49th Vice President of the United States and the first Asian/female/African American Vice President and Attorney General of California
Foung Hawj, pioneer Hmong broadcaster, was elected to Minnesota State Senate in 2012 with support from the Sierra Club and a broad multicultural network.
Mazie Hirono, former lieutenant governor of State of Hawaii, currently junior United States senator from Hawaii
Mike Honda, U.S. Congressman from California's 15th congressional district, became the highest-ranking Asian American member of the Democratic National Committee, as the party's vice-chair in 2005.
David Ige, governor of Hawaii from 2014 to 2022
Daniel Inouye, became the first Japanese American elected to the U.S. House of Representatives in 1959. In 1962, he became the first Japanese American elected to the U.S. Senate. From 2010 until his death in 2012, he was the President pro tempore of the United States Senate and third in the United States presidential line of succession.
Bobby Jindal, Indian American, former governor of Louisiana.
Scott Kawasaki, Alaska State Senator
Jane Kim, Korean American politician and first Korean American elected official in San Francisco
Sung Kim, ambassador & diplomat
Young Kim, member of the United States House of Representatives (R-CA)
Padma Kuppa, first Indian immigrant and Hindu in the Michigan Legislature; current member of Michigan's House of Representatives, representing Michigan's 41st district.
Tony Lam, became the first Vietnamese American elected to office when he was elected to the Westminster, California city council in 1992.
Susan C. Lee, first Asian American elected to Maryland State Senate.
Ted Lieu, member of the United States House of Representatives (D-CA)
Gary Locke, elected the first Asian American governor in the mainland United States in November 1996 and became Governor of Washington in January 1997.
John Liu, became the first Asian American elected to the New York City Council (representing Flushing, Queens) in 2001.
Kinjiro Matsudaira, mayor of Edmonston, Maryland in 1927 and 1943
Bob Matsui, Representative from California
Doris Matsui, Congresswoman from California
Jimmy Meng, became the first Asian American elected to the New York State Legislature in 2004.
Aruna Miller, first Indian American woman elected to the Maryland House of Delegates in 2010.
Norman Mineta, became the first Asian American in the U.S. Cabinet when Bill Clinton appointed him Secretary of Commerce in 2000, serving in that post until 2001, when George W. Bush appointed him Secretary of Transportation, serving until 2006. Also mayor of San Jose, California from 1971 to 1975.
Patsy Takemoto Mink became the first Asian American woman to serve in Congress, as a representative of Hawaii in 1964; she ended up serving 12 terms.
Mee Moua, became the first Hmong American elected to any state legislature. A Democrat representing St. Paul's East Side, she is the highest ranking Hmong American elected official in the United States in 2002.
Aftab Pureval, Mayor of Cincinnati
Sean Reyes, current U.S. attorney general of Utah
Eunice Sato, became the first Asian-American female mayor of a major American city (Long Beach, California) in 1980
Dalip Singh Saund, became the first Asian immigrant elected to the U.S. Congress upon his election to the House of Representatives in 1956.
Kim Singh, former Chair of Asia Pacific Caucus of CDP. California Democratic Party. Vice President. Stonewall Democratic Club Los Angeles. Executive Director. AAPPI. Asian American Public Policy Institute.
Sichan Siv, former U.S. Ambassador to the United Nations Economic and Social Council and the author of Golden Bones.
Michelle Steel, member of the United States House of Representatives (R-CA)
Marilyn Strickland, member of the United States House of Representatives (D-WA)
Saghir Tahir, served as a New Hampshire State Representative. Only elected Muslim in the Republican Party.
Mark Takano, U.S. congressman.
Sheng Thao, mayor of Oakland, California, first Hmong-American mayor of a major U.S. city
Jill Tokuda, U.S. Representative from Hawaii
William Tong, Connecticut Attorney General.
Van Tran, elected a Republican member of the California State Assembly and is the first Vietnamese American to serve in any state legislature in 2004.
Hubert Vo, Vietnamese immigrant, became the first Vietnamese American elected to the Texas Legislature in 2004.
Shien Biau Woo became the first Asian American statewide officer in the Northeast, when he was elected Lieutenant Governor of Delaware in 1984.
Leana Wen, prominent Asian American and public health leader, currently Commissioner of Health in Baltimore.
David Wu, first Taiwanese American U.S. Representative (D-OR)
Michelle Wu first female Asian American Boston City Councilor, first Boston City Councilor of Chinese descent, and first Asian American to be Mayor of Boston.
Andrew Yang first Asian-American man to run for President of the United States as a Democrat for (2020 United States presidential election) 
Kimberly Yee, became Arizona's first Asian American woman to serve as a member of the Arizona State Legislature.

Religion

 Angela Warnick Buchdahl (born 1972), rabbi
 Randolph Roque Calvo, 7th Bishop of Reno, mixed Chamorro, Filipino, and Spanish.
 Francis Chan, American preacher. He is the former teaching pastor of Cornerstone Community Church in Simi Valley, California, a Christian church he and his wife started in 1994.
 Bruce Reyes-Chow, first American-born Asian American to be elected moderator of the 2.2-million-member Presbyterian Church (USA) in 2008.
 Bhante Dharmawara, Buddhist monk and teacher who helped resettle thousands of Cambodian refugees in the US and founded the first Cambodian Buddhist temple in USA.
 Gerrit W. Gong, Apostle, Quorum of the 12 Apostles, The Church of Jesus Christ of Latter-day Saints.
 Ruben Habito,  Filipino Zen Master of the Sanbō Kyōdan lineage and founder of Maria Kannon Zen Center in Dallas, Texas.
 Jian Tan, Buddhist monk and current abbot of the Chung Tai Zen Center of Houston.
 Hae Jong Kim, elected Bishop of United Methodist Church in 1992.
 Seyoon Kim, biblical scholar at Fuller Theological Seminary.
 Jakusho Kwong, American Chinese Zen Master of Shunryu Suzuki lineage, founder and head abbot of Sonoma Mountain Zen Center.
 Sang Hyun Lee, theologian at Princeton Theological Seminary.
 Dominic Mai Thanh Lương, auxiliary bishop of the Roman Catholic Diocese of Orange.
 Chieko Okazaki, Relief Society General Presidency, Church of Jesus Christ of Latter-day Saints. First person of color to serve on general boards of the church. Served on the Young Women, Primary, and Relief Society General Boards in Salt Lake City, Utah. (From Hawaiʻi).
 Andrew S. Park, teaches at United Theological Seminary in Trotwood, Ohio.
 Peter C. Phan, American Catholic theologian who is a native of Vietnam.
 Shi Yan Ming, 34th generation Shaolin monk and founder of the USA Shaolin Temple.
 Oscar A. Solis, first Filipino American Roman Catholic bishop in the United States.
 C. S. Song, Distinguished Professor Emeritus of Theology and Asian Cultures at the Pacific School of Religion and acting minister at the Formosan United Methodist Church in San Leandro, California.
 Su Bong, Korean American Zen Master from Kwan Um School of Zen and the designated heir of Seung Sahn's lineage.
 Kenneth K. Tanaka, scholar, author, translator and ordained Jōdo Shinshū priest.
 Thích Thiên-Ân, Buddhist monk, meditation teacher and founder of International Buddhist Meditation Center in Los Angeles, California.
 Ignatius C. Wang, first Chinese American to become a bishop in the Catholic Church.
 Amos Yong, professor of systematic theology at Regent University.
 Jimmy Yu (Guo Gu or 果谷), Chan teacher of Sheng Yen lineage, Associate Professor of Religion at Florida State University and founder of Tallahassee Chan Center in Tallahassee, Florida.

Space

This section is a list of astronauts of Asian ancestry who are, by birth or naturalization, American citizens.

Sports
Benny Agbayani – former outfielder for New York Mets, Colorado Rockies, Kansas City Royals, and Chiba Lotte Marines
Nathan Adrian – swimmer, multiple Olympic medalist
Bobby Balcena – first Asian American player in MLB
David Bautista – WWE performer going by the name "Batista"
Mohini Bhardwaj – American gymnast and 2004 Olympic silver medalist in the gymnastics team competition
Raj Bhavsar – 2008 Olympic bronze medalist in the gymnastics team competition
Tedy Bruschi – American football linebacker for the New England Patriots
Johnny Chan – professional poker player
Michael Chang – won tennis' French Open in 1989
Nathan Chen – American figure skater and Olympic gold medalist
Brandon Chillar – American football linebacker for the Green Bay Packers
Tiffany Chin – won the US Figure Skating Championship in 1985
Simon Cho – short track speed skater, Olympic medalist
Amy Chow – won gold and silver medals in gymnastics during the 1996 Olympics.
Norm Chow – former head coach of the Hawaii football team and former offensive coordinator for the Tennessee Titans after helping lead USC to several NCAA championships as the offensive coordinator there. Currently the offensive coordinator for the Los Angeles Wildcats of the XFL.
Julie Chu – Olympics hockey player
Clarissa Chun – 2 time Olympic Women's freestyle 48 kg (105.5 lbs) wrestler
Patrick Chung – 2-time Super Bowl champion, NFL player of Chinese Jamaican heritage with New England Patriots
Jordan Clarkson – Filipino American NBA player
Bryan Clay – won the decathlon gold medal in the 2008 Olympics, the silver medal in the 2004 Olympics, and was the sport's 2005 world champion
Alex Compton – basketball coach
Tim Cone – basketball coach
Emily Cross – fencer, Olympic medalist
Natalie Coughlin – Olympic gold medalist in swimming
Johnny Damon – 2 time All-Star MLB outfielder currently a free agent
Toby Dawson – won a 2006 Olympic bronze medal in Men's Freestyle skiing
Bill Demong – Nordic combined skier, Olympic medalist
Kris Dim – IFBB professional bodybuilder
Victoria Draves – first Asian American to earn a gold medal in the Olympics, winning both the 1948 platform and springboard events
Mathew Dumba – Canadian ice hockey defenseman for the Minnesota Wild.
Tommy Edman – Major League Baseball player
Mark Foo – professional surfer
Rickie Fowler – golfer
Catherine Fox – swimmer, double Olympic champion
Miki Gorman (1935–2015) – two-time winner of both the Boston and New York City marathons; former American and unofficial world record holder in the marathon
Alexi Grewal – Gold medalist in 1984 Summer Olympics in cycling
Eileen Gu – Olympic skier who competes for China
Satoshi Hirayama – baseball player
Derek Ho – professional surfer
Maria Ho – professional poker player
Steven Ho – martial artist
Ken Hoang – professional gamer
Ivana Hong – American gymnast
Ariel Hsing – youngest American U.S. table tennis national champion in history
Rena Inoue – first place in the 2004 and 2006 U.S. Figure Skating Championships (pairs)
Travis Ishikawa – Free Agent first baseman
Haley Ishimatsu – American platform diver and member of the 2008 U.S. Olympic team
Natasha Kai – American soccer player and part of the gold medal-winning team in the 2008 Beijing Olympics
Danielle Kang – professional golfer
Masako Katsura – professional carom billiards player
Evelyn Kawamoto – won two Olympic bronze medals in swimming in 1952.
Anthony Kim – American professional golfer and part of the winning USA team in the 2008 Ryder Cup
Chloe Kim – American snowboarder and Olympic gold medalist
Ford Konno – former world record holder, two-time Olympic gold medalist, two-time Olympic silver medalist in swimming (1952 and 1956)
Tommy Kono (1930–2016) – former world record holder, two-time Olympic gold medalist and Olympic silver medalist in weightlifting (1952, 1956, and 1960)
Younghoe Koo – current NFL kicker for the Atlanta Falcons
Michelle Kwan – won nine national championships and five world titles, as well as two Olympic medals (silver in 1998, bronze in 2002) in figure skating
Iris Kyle - professional bodybuilder
Kyle Larson – American professional stock car racing driver
Cung Le – UFC mma fighter / former Strikeforce middleweight champion 
Jeanette Lee – pool player
Sammy Lee (1920–2016) – became the first Asian American man to earn an Olympic gold medal, when he won in platform diving in both 1948 and 1952
Sunisa Lee – won the 2020 Olympics all-around gymnastics gold medal 
Jeremy Lin – Taiwanese American point guard for the Beijing Ducks and 2019 NBA champion.
Tim Lincecum – 2 time Cy Young Award-winning pitcher for the San Francisco Giants
Alysa Liu – figure skater
Mike Lum – Major League Baseball player
Mike Magpayo – current men's basketball head coach at UC Riverside; first Asian American to serve in this role at an NCAA Division I school
Alexander Massialas – fencer, Olympic medalist
Kalei Mau – volleyball player
Wataru Misaka – broke the NBA color barrier in the 1947–48 season, when he played for the New York Knicks
Yul Moldauer – artistic gymnast
Collin Morikawa – golfer who won the 2020 PGA Championship and 2021 Open Championship
Mirai Nagasu – women's singles figure skating champion in 2008 and an Olympic bronze medalist
Haruki Nakamura – Free Safety of the Carolina Panthers
Hikaru Nakamura – became the youngest American ever to earn the titles of National Master (age 10) and International Grandmaster (age 15) in chess
Paeng Nepomuceno – won in almost every major international bowling championships
Kim Ng – current general manager of the Miami Marlins; first woman to serve in that role in any of the "Big Four" professional leagues of North America
Dat Nguyen – was an All-American linebacker at Texas A&M University and later became the first Vietnamese American in the National Football League
Apolo Anton Ohno – won eight Olympic medals in short-track speed skating (two gold) in 2002, 2006, and 2010 as well as a world cup championship
Naomi Osaka – Japanese-American tennis champion
Yoshinobu Oyakawa – former world record holder and 1952 Olympic gold medalist in the 100-meter backstroke
Tommy Pham – Major League Baseball player
Rajeev Ram – tennis player, Olympic medalist
Dave Roberts – former Major League Baseball player, 2004 World Series champion, and current manager of the Los Angeles Dodgers.
Jason Robertson – left winger for the Dallas Stars in the National Hockey League
Kyla Ross – 2012 Olympic gold medalist gymnast, numerous World Championships medalist, and NCAA champion
Addison Russell – Filipino-American Baseball Player, and 2016 World Series Champion
Harold Sakata – won a weightlifting silver medal in the 1948 Olympics
Eric Sato – won a 1988 Olympic gold medal in volleyball
Liane Sato – won a 1992 Olympic bronze medal in volleyball
Alex Shibutani – figure skater, Olympic medalist
Maia Shibutani – figure skater, Olympic medalist
Dave Shoji – former head coach of the Hawaii Rainbow Wahine volleyball team and the winningest head coach in NCAA Division I Women's Volleyball History. 
Erik Shoji – volleyball player, Olympic medalist
Kawika Shoji – volleyball player, Olympic medalist
Vijay Singh – professional golfer
Wesley So – chess grandmaster
Erik Spoelstra – head coach of the Miami Heat; Filipino mother
Kurt Suzuki – Major League Baseball player
Kevin Tan – American gymnast and part of the bronze medal-winning team in the 2008 Beijing Olympics
Sonya Thomas – one of the world's top competitive eaters
Brandon Vera – UFC fighter
Shane Victorino – former Major League Baseball player, and 2x World Series Champion (2008, 2013).
Hines Ward – was the MVP of Super Bowl XL while playing for the Pittsburgh Steelers
Ed Wang – became the first fully Chinese-American selected in the NFL Draft when drafted by the Buffalo Bills
Michelle Wie – golfer
Kolten Wong – Major League Baseball player
Tiger Woods – golfer of Chinese, Thai, Caucasian, African American, and Native American descent; self described as  "Cablinasian" (a syllabic abbreviation he coined from Caucasian, Black, American Indian, and Asian)
Kristi Yamaguchi – won three national figure skating championships, two world titles, and the 1992 Olympic gold medal
Tabitha Yim – American gymnast
Wally Yonamine – multisport athlete, played for the San Francisco 49ers (1947), Yomiuri Giants (1951–1960), Chunichi Dragons (1961–1962), and manager of the Chunichi Dragons (1972–1977). Only American to be admitted into the Japanese Baseball Hall of Fame.
Al Young – world champion race car driver
Jennifer Yu – U.S. women's chess champion in 2019 and 2022
Caroline Zhang – American figure skater and 2007 Junior World Champion

Other 
Frank Chu – professional protester
Edsel Ford Fong – waiter known for his rudeness
Chol Soo Lee – man falsely accused of killing Chinatown gang leader
Wayne Lo – mass murderer
Charles Ng – serial killer
Hiu Lui Ng – Chinese immigrant who died in U.S. Immigration and Customs Enforcement custody
Betty Ong – flight attendant killed in the September 11 attacks
Bei Bei Shuai – woman charged with attempted murder after her suicide attempt resulted in the death of her fetus
Chai Vang – mass murderer
Eddy Zheng – youth counselor

See also

List of Asian American writers
List of Bangladeshi Americans
List of Burmese Americans
List of Cambodian Americans
List of Chinese Americans
List of Filipino Americans
List of Hmong Americans
List of Indian Americans
List of Indonesian Americans
List of Japanese Americans
List of Korean Americans
List of Laotian Americans
List of Pakistani Americans
List of Sri Lankan Americans
List of Taiwanese Americans
List of Vietnamese Americans

Footnotes

 
 
Asian Americans, notable
Asian Americans
Asian
Asian